The Blackburn Shark was a carrier-borne torpedo bomber designed and built by the British aviation manufacturer Blackburn Aircraft. It was originally known as the Blackburn T.S.R., standing for torpedo-spotter-reconnaissance, in reference to its intended roles. The Shark was the last of Blackburn's biplane torpedo bombers.

The prototype Shark performed its maiden flight on 24 August 1933, the first production aircraft was introduced to service during the following year. It was operated by the Fleet Air Arm, Royal Canadian Air Force, Portuguese Navy, and the British Air Observers' School. By 1937, the Shark was already approaching obsolescence and replacement by the more capable Fairey Swordfish began during the following year. Despite this, numerous aircraft continued to be operated during the Second World War, largely being confined to secondary roles away from the front lines, such as training and target tug duties. Despite this, Sharks were repeatedly deployed in frontline roles during events such as the Dunkirk Evacuation and the Japanese invasion of British Malaya. During 1945, the final Sharks were withdrawn from service.

Design and development

Background
The Blackburn T.9 Shark has its origins within the early 1930s as a private venture by the company. Originally known as the Blackburn T.S.R., standing for torpedo-spotter-reconnaissance,  it was designed in conformance with Air Ministry Specification S.15/33, which sought a combined torpedo-spotter-reconnaissance aircraft for the Fleet Air Arm (FAA). Blackburn was not the only company that opted to pursue this requirement; Fairey Aviation designed the TSR 1, a forerunner to the highly successful Fairey Swordfish that was active during the Second World War.

The T.S.R. represented a substantial departure from Blackburn's previous naval aircraft designs, as the design team had opted to eliminate almost all use of streamlined bracing wires in favour of slanted struts. Despite this change, the wings were still foldable to ease stowage; a hydraulic wing-locking mechanism was incorporated to speed up folding/unfolding actions. Further measures to improve deck handling included the adoption of a tracking tail and pneumatic wheel brakes. The design process had been aided by operational experienced gained from the Blackburn Baffin. Features, such as the camber-changing flaps and fuselage construction, were derived from earlier prototypes.

Initially, the design of the T.S.R featured open cockpits, which were heated by an exhaust pipe muff. It had a crew of three, with the pilot seated in the first cockpit while the observer/wireless operator and gunner sharing the second cockpit, although longer range missions would sometimes be flown with only a crew of two. A prone position for bombing missions was also provisioned for, which included a watertight hatch and a hinged course-setting bomb sight. The bomb fusing controls were placed within reach of both the pilot and observer positions; ammunition was stowed in ten ammunition pans within the gunner's cockpit. Armament consisted of one fixed, forward-firing .303 in (7.7 mm) Vickers machine gun, plus a .303 in (7.7 mm) Vickers K machine gun or Lewis Gun mounted on a Scarff ring in the rear cockpit, with provision for a  torpedo or equivalent bombload carried externally.

The fuselage was strengthened to withstand catapult launches and divided into watertight compartments. Structural elements included stainless steel tubular spars and light alloy ribs; similar materials were used for the entire tail section save for the Alclad-plated fin. The majority of the flying surfaces had fabric coverings; the wing tips were detachable as to allow their easy replacement if damaged. The main fuel tanks were not integral to the structure; instead, two detachable tanks composed of duralumin were carried in separate watertight compartments forward of the pilot, housing up to 182.5 gallons of fuel. The aircraft had a range of 623 miles normally, but this could be extended to 1,130 miles via the use of a cylindrical tank, attached to the torpedo crutches, that was capable of holding up to 150 gallons of additional fuel.

Into flight
On 24 August 1933, Blackburn's B-6 prototype, powered by with a  Armstrong Siddeley Tiger IV engine, made its maiden flight at Brough. Following the completion of manufacturer trials, during which the engine was enclosed in a long-chord cowling, this prototype was delivered to the Aeroplane and Armament Experimental Establishment (A&AEE) at RAF Martlesham Heath for an official performance evaluation on 26 November 1933. During the following year, after the conclusion of testing at Martlesham, it was transferred to Gosport ahead of deck landing trials on board the aircraft carrier . These having been deemed successful as well, the prototype was taken up by the Directorate of Technical Development.

During August 1934, Blackburn received an initial production order for 16 aircraft to be produced for the FAA. One month later, limited production had already commenced. During October 1934, the name Shark I was officially sanctioned; around this time, a series of modifications were implemented, the most visible of which was a lengthened engine cowling that enclosed the exhaust collector ring. Amongst the modifications needed was for the aircraft to be convertible to a seaplane configuration, thus the prototype was overhauled and outfitted with twin floats equipped with shock absorbers. In this configuration, early test flights were conducted at Brough during April 1935; a successful series of sea trials took place at the Marine Aircraft Experimental Establishment Felixstowe.

Blackburn was issued contract No. 334315/34 in conjunction with the new Specification 13/35. I, along with the additional contract No. 510994/35 to Specification 19/36, which was issued in January 1937. Even more contracts soon followed, leading to the rate of production exceeding that of numerous preceding Blackburn aircraft. During a three-year production run, a total of 238 Sharks were delivered to the FAA, comprising 16 Mk I (Tiger IV), 126 Mk II (760 hp/567 kW Tiger VI) and 95 Mk III (760 hp/570 kW Tiger VI). The Shark III differed from prior models in several respects, the most apparent of which was the addition of a glazed cockpit canopy and three-bladed Rotol wooden propellers. Late on in production, assembly from components produced elsewhere took place at Blackburn's new factory in Dumbarton, Scotland, after which the completed airframes were transported by road to the Clyde for flight testing.

Operational history

Fleet Air Arm

During May 1935, the Shark entered service with 820 Naval Air Squadron, replacing its Fairey Seals, aboard HMS Courageous. During the following year, it also equipping an additional two squadrons, 810 and 821. The FAA opted to actively deploy the Shark both in its landplane configuration on board the Royal Navy's aircraft carriers and as a seaplane on its battlecruisers, such as HMS Warspite and HMS Repulse; in the latter capacity, it would either be catapult-launched or lowered over the side to take off from the water, dependent on available equipment. Its seaworthiness was a particular point of praise, possessing favourable rough water handling and buoyancy characteristics.

Frontline operations involving the Shark were curtailed after only a relatively short timespan, as the type had started to be replaced by the more capable Fairey Swordfish as early as 1937. However, its value in secondary roles meant that it continued to be operated for numerous years beyond this point; a considerable number of Shark IIs were operated by the B and C training flights at Lee-on-Solent. 20 Sharks were converted by Blackburn into target tugs and saw use at units in Abbotsinch, Gosport, Crail, and Arbroath to help train pilots, starting in 1939. On 4 January 1939, two Sharks were taken up by No. 4 Anti-Aircraft Co-Operation Unit in Seletar, Singapore.

During the Dunkirk evacuation conducted between 26 May and 4 June 1940, numerous Sharks flew across the English Channel to spot and illuminate Kriegsmarine E-boats using flares, they were otherwise unarmed; these operations were hindered and eventually stopped by poor weather conditions. Widespread use of the Shark III for the training of aerial observers and navigators proceeded as far afield as Trinidad; its use in this role continued to as late as 1942.

Numerous Sharks would eventually be based at RAF Seletar as target tugs. During January 1942, the type was used to conduct patrol missions and even bombing raids against units of the Imperial Japanese Army as it advanced into Malaya.

Overseas operators

On 10 April 1935, Blackburn successfully secured a contract over rival firms from the United States, Germany, Czechoslovakia, and Italy valued at £50,000 from the Portuguese government for six seaplanes. Designated Shark IIA, these were largely identical to FAA aircraft, save for being equipped with different armament carriage arrangements - some could only be armed with torpedoes. The Portuguese Navy took delivery of the aircraft in mid-1936, stationing them at Bom Succeso on the River Tagus outside Lisbon for coastal defense duties. On 22 October 193, a long distance non-stop flight was conducted by a Portuguese Shark between Bom Succeso and RAF Calshot, carrying a diplomatic dispatch to London and returning six days later.

During 1936, the Royal Canadian Air Force (RCAF) purchased seven Blackburn Shark II (760 hp/570 kW Tiger VI), the first four of which were shipped in September of that year. It was initially flown by No 6 (TB) Squadron, later operating as No 6 (BR) Sqn, to perform shipping patrols off the west coast of Canada. The type was reportedly appreciated for its rugged design and ease of maintenance, particular when operated from remote areas far from well-equipped workshops. The Shark became an element of a wider plan to bolster Canada's domestic production of aircraft; during early 1939, a pair of Shark IIIs (800 hp/600 kW Pegasus III) were supplied by Blackburn to serve as pattern aircraft for a further 17 aircraft that were locally produced by Boeing Aircraft of Canada at their Vancouver facility.

The Canadian-built aircraft were powered by  Pegasus IX engines and were supplied to Nos 6 and 4 (BR) Squadrons. However, by the time quantity manufacturing had been attained in Vancouver, it was becoming increasingly recognised that the Shark was too obsolete to fulfil Canada's ongoing wartime needs. Nevertheless, these aircraft produced were deployed for naval reconnaissance and the escorting of friendly shipping near to Canada. The last of the RCAF's Sharks, some of which were operated as floatplanes, were withdrawn from service during August 1944, after which five aircraft were transferred to the RN Air Observers' School in Trinidad.

Variants
 B-3 : Torpedo-bomber prototype.
 B-6 : Shark prototype.
 Shark Mk I : Two- or three-seat torpedo bomber, reconnaissance aircraft for the Royal Navy. Powered by a 700 hp (500 kW) Armstrong Siddeley Tiger IV radial piston engine.
 Shark Mk II : Two- or three-seat torpedo bomber, reconnaissance aircraft for the Royal Navy and RCAF. Powered by a 760 hp (570 kW) Armstrong Siddeley Tiger VI radial piston engine.
 Shark Mk IIA : Two- or three-seat torpedo bomber, reconnaissance floatplanes for the Portuguese Navy. Powered by a 760 hp (570 kW) Armstrong Siddeley Tiger VIC radial piston engine. Six built.
 Shark Mk III : Two- or three-seat torpedo bomber, reconnaissance aircraft for the Royal Navy. Fitted with a glazed canopy and dual controls for crew training. Powered by an 800 hp (600 kW) Bristol Pegasus III radial piston engine.

Operators

 Royal Canadian Air Force
 No. 4 Squadron RCAF
 No. 6 Squadron RCAF
 No. 7 Squadron RCAF
 No. 111 Squadron RCAF
 No. 118 Squadron RCAF
 No. 122 Squadron RCAF

 Portuguese Navy - Six aircraft

 Royal Navy Fleet Air Arm
701 Naval Air Squadron
705 Naval Air Squadron
753 Naval Air Squadron
755 Naval Air Squadron
757 Naval Air Squadron
758 Naval Air Squadron
767 Naval Air Squadron
774 Naval Air Squadron
780 Naval Air Squadron
785 Naval Air Squadron
810 Naval Air Squadron
821 Naval Air Squadron
822 Naval Air Squadron
 Royal Air Force

Specifications (Shark Mk II)

See also

References

Citations

Bibliography

 
 
 Mason, Francis K. The British Bomber since 1914. London: Putnam Aeronautical Books, 1994. .
 Shores, Christopher, Brian Cull and Yasuho Izawa. Bloody Shambles:Volume One:The Drift to War to the Fall of Singapore. London:Grub Street, 1992. .
 Taylor, John W.R. "Blackburn Shark." Combat Aircraft of the World from 1909 to the present. New York: G.P. Putnam's Sons, 1969. .
 
 Vincent, Carl. The Blackburn Shark (Canada's Wings Vol. 1). Stittsville, Ontario: Canada's Wings, 1974.

1930s British bomber aircraft
Carrier-based aircraft
Shark
Single-engined tractor aircraft
Biplanes
Aircraft first flown in 1933